Synchronized swimming at the 2004 Summer Olympics was held in the Olympic Aquatic Centre where 104 competitors challenged for 2 gold medals in the duet and team events. Each event was made up of a technical and free routine with the points added together to determine the medalists.

Medal summary

Medal table

External links
Official result book – Synchronized Swimming

 
2004 Summer Olympics events
2004
2004 in synchronized swimming
Synchronized swimming in Greece